Hugger is a surname. Notable people with the surname include:

Jan Hugger (born 1998), German racing cyclist
Jon Hugger (born 1977), American wrestler
Svend Hugger (1925–2017), Danish footballer

See also
Huger